{{DISPLAYTITLE:C40H56O}}
The molecular formula C40H56O (molar mass: 552.85 g/mol, exact mass: 552.4331 u) may refer to:

 beta-Cryptoxanthin
 Mutatochrome
 Rubixanthin, also known as natural yellow 27

Molecular formulas